Dollar or Dolar is a name for multiple currencies around the world. 

Dollar or Dolar may also refer to:

Currency
English name of the early modern thaler coins
Dollar coin, coins of various countries
Dollar sign, or $

Places
Dollar, Clackmannanshire, a town in Scotland
Dollar Academy, a school in Dollar
Dollar, Alabama, an unincorporated community
Dollar, Ontario, Canada, a former community
Dollar Lake (disambiguation), various lakes in the United States
Dollar Lakes, three glacial tarns in Nevada
Dollar Glen, Scotland
Dollar Law, a hill in Scotland
Dólar, municipality in Spain

Entertainment
Dollar (film), a 1938 film by Gustaf Molander
Dollars (film), a 1971 motion picture also known as $
Dollars (soundtrack)
The Dollars Trilogy, three films by Sergio Leone
The Dollar, the original title for Philip Barry's play Holiday
Dollars, an internet-based anonymous gang in the Durarara!! light novels and anime
Dollar Comics, a line of DC Comics
Dollar, the dog owned by Richie Rich
Dollar (TV series), a Lebanese Arabic-language web television series

Music
Dollar (group), a pop vocal duo from the UK who had a series of hit records in the late 1970s and 1980s
The Dollar (album), a 2006 album by country music artist Jamey Johnson
"The Dollar" (song), a 2005 single from this album
"Dollar" (song), a 2019 song by Becky G and Myke Towers

Businesses
Dollar Rent A Car, an American car rental firm
Dollar Bank, a regional bank serving Pennsylvania and Ohio
Dollar Savings Bank, a defunct bank founded in New York City in 1890
Dollar Financial Group, a US-based financial services group
Dollar Steamship Company, established by Robert Dollar

Other uses 
Dollar (surname)
Dollar (motorcycle), a French-made motorcycle
Sand dollar, a close cousin of the sea urchin
Battle of Dollar, fought in 875 at Dollar, Scotland
Dollar (reactivity), a term used in nuclear chain reaction kinetics

See also
$ (disambiguation)
Dollar store